Morjana Alaoui (born November 30, 1982) is a Moroccan-French actress. She is best known for her starring roles in director Laila Marrakchi's Marock and Rock the Casbah, films which dealt with sexual taboos, cultural and religious values, and female emancipation in Morocco. She also starred in Pascal Laugier's horror film Martyrs,  a polarizing film and associated with the New French Extremity movement.

Biography
Alaoui spent her early life in the Anfa neighborhood of Casablanca, Morocco, and studied at the Casablanca American School. At 18, Alaoui moved to Paris, France, where she studied at the American University of Paris. While attending the university, she met director Laila Marrakchi, who offered her a role in the film Marock (2005). Marock was critically acclaimed and provided Alaoui national fame. In 2007, she began filming Martyrs, for which she is also known. In 2016 Alaoui starred in psychological thriller Broken directed by Shaun Robert Smith.

Filmography

References

External links

 

Moroccan film actresses
People from Casablanca
1983 births
Living people
Moroccan emigrants to the United States
American film actresses
21st-century Moroccan actresses
American University of Paris alumni
21st-century American women